Desvelado is the debut studio album by American Tejano music singer Bobby Pulido.

Track listing 
"No Se Por Que" 
"Desvelado"
"Sabes"
"Cuando Me Dejes de Amar"
"Cindy Don't Know"
"Te Voy a Amar"
"Quiero Decirte"
"Se Me Olvidó Olvidarte"
"Ya No Quiero Soñar"
"Regretfully"

Charts

Weekly charts

Year-end charts

Certifications

See also 

 1995 in Latin music
 Latin American music in the United States

References 

1995 debut albums
Bobby Pulido albums
EMI Latin albums
Spanish-language albums